"Set Me Free" is a song by Ray Davies, released first by the Kinks in 1965.  Along with "Tired of Waiting for You", it is one of band's first attempts at a softer, more introspective sound.  The song's B-side, "I Need You", makes prominent use of powerchords in the style of the Kinks' early, "raunchy" sound. "Set Me Free" was heard in the Ken Loach-directed Up the Junction, a BBC Wednesday Play which aired in November 1965; this marked the first appearance of a Kinks song on a film or TV soundtrack.

Billboard said of the single that "hot on the heels of [the Kinks'] 'Tired of Waiting for You' smash comes this down home blues rhythm material with a good teen lyric."  Cash Box described it as "a snappy tune that’s taken for an engaging disk ride."



Personnel 
According to band researcher Doug Hinman:

The Kinks
Ray Davies lead vocal, rhythm guitar
Dave Davies backing vocal, lead guitar
Pete Quaife bass
Mick Avory drums

Additional musician
Rasa Davies backing vocal

Charts

References

Sources

 
 

1965 singles
The Kinks songs
Song recordings produced by Shel Talmy
Songs written by Ray Davies
Pye Records singles
1965 songs
Reprise Records singles